Area code 56 serves Mexico City and its metropolitan area. The area code was assigned in October 2018 to alleviate saturation of area code 55. Area code 56 is an overlay of area code 55, covering the same area with approximately 2,200,000 numbers assigned to this area code as of November 2018.

States in the area code: 2

Municipalities in the area code: 45

Cities and Towns in the area code: 117

Companies providing phone service in the area code: 53

Local Number: 7 Digits

International dialing: +52 + 56 + 8 digits

References

55
Mexico City